An omega chain or omega necklace is a pseudo-chain made by assembling metallic plates on a wire or woven mesh.  The plates give the appearance of links in a chain.  The embedded wire provides the strength, so the plates can be designed to please the eye.

See also
Persian weave

References

Types of jewellery